T'Boli, officially the Municipality of T'Boli, is a 1st class municipality in the province of South Cotabato, Philippines. According to the 2020 census, it has a population of 101,049 people. The town is named after the indigenous natives themselves, the Tboli people.

Located in the town is Lake Holon within Mount Parker. The lake was declared as the cleanest inland body of water in the entire country in 2003 and 2004.

Geography

Barangays
Tboli is politically subdivided into 25 barangays.

Climate

Demographics

Economy

References

External links
 Tboli Profile at PhilAtlas.com
 T'boli Profile at the DTI Cities and Municipalities Competitive Index
 [ Philippine Standard Geographic Code]
Philippine Census Information

Municipalities of South Cotabato